Rainha de Beleza (Portuguese and Capeverdean Creole for the "Queen of Beauty")' is a 2006 album by Val Xalino.  The album was released in 2006 and is named a song in the earlier album Emoções (1993) and the latest version released in 2006.  On the latter of both discs, the duet is made together with Val Xalino's son, rapper and producer Roberto Xalino.

On the album, there are tracks by Val and Roberto Xalino as well as Luís Silva and Jovino dos Santos.

Track listing

References

External links
 
 Lyrics of one of the singles from the album

2006 albums
Albums by Val Xalino